The Church of Israel (formerly the Church of Our Christian Heritage) is a denomination that emerged from the Church of Christ (Temple Lot) in the Latter Day Saint movement.

History
The Church of Israel was first organized in 1972. Dan Gayman had deposed the leaders of the Church of Christ at Zion's Retreat and was then elected leader of that church. Most of the members of the church followed Gayman. However, the deposed leaders of the Zion's Retreat church sued Gayman, and the courts ordered that the church property and name be returned to the deposed leaders, and that the members of Gayman's congregation be barred from the premises. Gayman informally organized his congregation under the name "the Church of Our Christian Heritage". In 1977, Gayman and 10 other individuals were arrested for trespassing when they led a group back to the Church of Christ at Zion's Retreat in an attempted forcible takeover. In 1981, Gayman incorporated his church under the name Church of Israel. Little of the Latter Day Saint movement background of the church remains in its current teachings and practices, although the influence and beliefs of the Fettingites seem to be apparent in the rural and isolationist ("survivalist") settings for the church's headquarters and are practiced by many of its adherents. ("Message 18" in the Fettingite corpora urges believers to "go to the land" in order to "flee destruction" in or of, American cities.)

An investigative newspaper report about the Church of Israel was published in the Joplin Globe in January 2001. The report was mostly negative and suggested that the church had ties to the Christian Identity movement. The Anti-Defamation League includes the Church of Israel in its list of "extremist groups." The ADL report states that members of the church are said to have been involved at times with controversial figures such as Bo Gritz, Eric Rudolph, and Thomas Robb, a national leader of the Ku Klux Klan. Donna Henderson, a Republican member of the North Dakota House of Representatives who was first elected in 2022, has close ties to the church as well.

2003 Rudolph connection

In 2003, it was revealed that the Olympic Park bomber and one of the FBI's Ten Most Wanted Fugitives, Eric Rudolph, and his mother had attended the Church of Israel in 1984 for three or four months, when Eric was 18. Gayman assumed a fatherly relationship with Rudolph and planned to groom Eric as a potential son-in-law by encouraging Eric to date his daughter.

2003 lawsuit 
After a falling-out between Gayman and two other leaders of the church in 2003, Gayman filed a lawsuit in an attempt to revoke a severance agreement that included the deed to a house and property that had been given to a former minister, Scott Stinson. Ultimately the judge sided with Stinson.

Publications
The church issues a quarterly newsletter called The Watchman.

Beliefs
The church's doctrine states that it believes in one true and everliving, self-existing, uncreated God whose name is Jehovah and in the Trinity - however rejecting the term in favor of the term Godhead. It also believes the Gifts of the Spirit still continue into the modern day. Where it diverges from mainstream Christianity is in its advocacy of Kinism and Dominionism.

Serpent seed doctrine 

Gayman is famous for propagating the theology known as "two-seedline", or "serpent seed" doctrine. This doctrine holds that white people are descendants of Adam and are hence the chosen people of God. The Jewish people are said to be descendants of Cain and thus of Satan. This belief was developed by Wesley A. Swift, Conrad Gaard, Dan Gayman, and William Potter Gale, among others.

Political views

The Church of Israel holds a "deep distrust for the government". At one time, the church did not believe in the use of Social Security numbers, driver's licenses, or marriage licenses. Most children in the church who were home-birthed do not have Social Security numbers.

Medicine

The Church of Israel believes that the medical profession is "Jewish" and discourages the use of doctors and immunizations.

Sabbath and holidays
Since 1987 The Church of Israel regards the seventh day as the Sabbath. It also rejects traditional Christian holidays such as Christmas and Easter as pagan innovations. It celebrates the Hebrew feast days in their stead.

Notes

References
 Brannan, David W. (1999). "The Evolution of the Church of Israel: Dangerous Mutations", Terrorism and Political Violence, vol. 11, no. 3, pp. 106–118.
 Kaplan, Jeffrey (1993). "The Context of American Millenarian Revolutionary Theology: The Case of the 'Identity Christian' Church of Israel", Terrorism and Political Violence, vol. 5, no. 1, pp. 30–82.

External links
 
 Old Official website

Christian denominations established in the 20th century
Christian Identity
Christian new religious movements
Hedrickite denominations in the Latter Day Saint movement
Latter Day Saint movement in Missouri
Mormonism and race
Organizations based in Missouri
Christian organizations established in 1972
Seventh-day denominations